William Francis Nolan (March 6, 1928 – July 15, 2021) was an American author who wrote hundreds of stories in the science fiction, fantasy, horror, and crime fiction genres.

Career
Nolan became involved in science-fiction fandom in the 1950s, and published several fanzines, including Ray Bradbury Review. During this time, Nolan befriended several science-fiction and fantasy writers, including Ray Bradbury, Robert Bloch, Richard Matheson, Charles Beaumont, and   Ray Russell. Nolan became a professional author in 1956. Nolan is perhaps best known for coauthoring the novel Logan's Run, with George Clayton Johnson,  but wrote literally hundreds of pieces, from poetry to nonfiction, to prose, for many publications, such as Sports Illustrated, Rogue, Playboy, Dark Discoveries, Nameless Digest, and others. Nolan wrote several mystery novels, including the "Challis" series. He also had a long career in the movie industry, primarily working for Dan Curtis, and co-wrote the screenplay for the 1976 horror film Burnt Offerings which starred Karen Black and Bette Davis.

Nolan was also a prolific editor of collections (by others), and anthologies, most recently co-editing two anthologies with friend, filmmaker, and writer Jason V Brock: The Bleeding Edge (2009), with stories from fellow writers Ray Bradbury, Richard Matheson, George Clayton Johnson, John Shirley, Dan O'Bannon, and several others, and The Devil's Coattails (2012), which featured offerings from Ramsey Campbell, S. T. Joshi, Richard Selzer, Earl Hamner, Jr., and more, both from Cycatrix Press. Nolan teamed up with Bluewater Productions for a comic book series, Logan's Run: Last Day, released in 2010. In addition, he developed comics based on one other property of his for Bluewater: Tales from William F. Nolan's Dark Universe (featuring stories adapted by Nolan and Brock and published in 2013). Another comic book mini-series Sam Space (forthcoming) has been scripted and approved.

Among his many accolades, Nolan was nominated once for the Edgar Allan Poe Award from the Mystery Writers of America.  He was voted a Living Legend in Dark Fantasy by the International Horror Guild in 2002, and in 2006 was bestowed the honorary title of Author Emeritus by the Science Fiction and Fantasy Writers of America. In 2010, he received the Lifetime Achievement Bram Stoker Award from the Horror Writers Association (HWA). In 2013 he was a recipient, along with Brian W. Aldiss, of the World Fantasy Convention Award in Brighton, England by the World Fantasy Convention. In May 2014, Nolan was presented with another Bram Stoker Award, for Superior Achievement in Nonfiction; this was for his collection about his late friend Ray Bradbury, called Nolan on Bradbury: Sixty Years of Writing about the Master of Science Fiction. In 2015, Nolan was named a World Horror Society Grand Master; the award was presented at the World Horror Convention in Atlanta, GA in May of that year.

Personal life
Nolan was born in Kansas City, Missouri, the son of Bernadette Mariana Kelly, a stenographer, and Michael Cahill Nolan, an adventurer, and sportsman. His family was Irish Catholic.  He briefly attended the Kansas City Art Institute.  Later, he worked for Hallmark Cards, Inc. writing verses and illustrating greeting cards before moving to California with his parents. 

After a few years working in offices, he met Charles Beaumont, who would remain a close friend until Beaumont's untimely death at age thirty-eight. Beaumont was instrumental in Nolan becoming an author. 

Nolan was a close friend to radio writer Norman Corwin as well as speculative writer Ray Bradbury. He was also a member of the influential Southern California School of Writers in the 1950s–1960s (known informally as "The Group"), many of whom wrote for Alfred Hitchcock Presents, The Twilight Zone, Star Trek, and other popular series of the day. Nolan was an ethical vegetarian and loved animals. In later life, he still wrote new material and was active in various literary projects, and conventions (he was Guest of Honor at Killer Con and Portland's Orycon, as well as a special guest at the World Horror Convention, World Fantasy Convention, and many others), and promotional opportunities. 

Though estranged for more than ten years, he had been married since 1970. He resided in Vancouver, Washington. With regard to his work, he stated: "I get excited about something, and I want to write about it."

Nolan died from complications of an infection in July 2021 at the age of 93.

Appearances: films, TV and documentaries
The Intruder (1962) as villain "Bart Carey"
Charles Beaumont: The Life of Twilight Zone’s Magic Man (JaSunni Productions, LLC; 2010) as himself
The AckerMonster Chronicles! (JaSunni Productions, LLC; 2012) as himself

Bibliography (partial)

Novels

The Logan Series
Novels and novellas:
Logan's Run (1967) – Novel (with George Clayton Johnson)
Logan's World (1977) – Second novel in the original "Logan Trilogy"
Logan's Search (1980) – Third novel in the "Logan Trilogy"
Logan's Return (2001) – Novella, released as an e-book
Collections:
Logan: A Trilogy (1986) – Collection of the first three books
Definitive Editions:
Logan's Run: The Definitive Edition (An illustrated, limited edition from Centipede Press with extra material; 2014)

The Black Mask Series
The Black Mask Murders (1994) – Novel
The Marble Orchard (1996) – Novel
Sharks Never Sleep (1998) – Novel

The Sam Space Series
Space for Hire (1971) – Novel
Look Out for Space (1985) – Novel
3 For Space (1992) – Collection
Far Out (2004) – Collection
Seven for Space (2008) – Collection

The Challis Series
Death Is For Losers (1968) – Novel
The White Cad Cross-Up (1969) – Novel
Helle on Wheels (1992) – Novella
The Brothers Challis (1996) – Collection

The Kincaid Series
Pirate's Moon (1987) – Novella
Broxa (1991) - Novella
The Winchester Horror (1998) – Novella
Demon! [Reprint of Broxa] (2005) – Novella
Kincaid: A Paranormal Casebook (2011) – Collection

Biographies

On Max Brand
Max Brand's Best Western Stories (1981) – Brand Collection
Max Brand's Best Western Stories II (1985) – Brand Collection
Max Brand: Western Giant (1986) – Anthology/Bibliography
Max Brand's Best Western Stories III (1987) – Brand Collection
Tales of the Wild West (1997) – Brand Collection
More Tales of the Wild West (1999) – Brand Collection
Masquerade (2005) – Brand Collection
King of the Pulps (forthcoming) – Biography

On Dashiell Hammett
Dashiell Hammett: A Casebook (1969) – Critical study
Hammett: A Life at the Edge (1983) – Biography
Dash (2004) – Stage Play
A Man Called Dash: The Life and Times of Samuel Dashiell Hammett (Alfred A. Knopf, 2015 [tentative release date]) – Definitive biography

On Ray Bradbury
Ray Bradbury Review (1952) – Anthology
The Ray Bradbury Index (1953) – Pamphlet
The Ray Bradbury Companion (1975) – Biography/bibliography
The Dandelion Chronicles (1984) – Pamphlet
The Bradbury Chronicles (1991) – Anthology (with Martin H. Greenberg)
Nolan On Bradbury: Sixty Years of Writing about the Master of Science Fiction (2013; Hippocampus Press) – Collected nonfiction book (Edited by S. T. Joshi)

Other biographies and nonfiction
Adventure on Wheels (1959) – John Fitch autobiography
Barney Oldfield (1961) – Biography
Phil Hill: Yankee Champion (1962) – Biography
John Huston: King Rebel (1965) - Biography
Sinners and Supermen (1965) – Nonfiction collection
Steve McQueen: Star on Wheels (1972) – Biography
Hemingway: Last Days of the Lion (1974) – Biographical chapbook
McQueen (1984) - Biography
The Black Mask Boys (1985) – Biography/Anthology
How to Write Horror Fiction (1990) – Reference
Let's Get Creative: Writing Fiction That Sells! (2006) - Reference

Bibliographies
The Work of Charles Beaumont (1986)
The Work of William F. Nolan (1988)

Anthologies and collections (as editor)
The Fiend in You (1962) – Anthology (with Charles Beaumont; Nolan is uncredited)
The Pseudo-People (1965)
Man Against Tomorrow (1965)
Il Meglio Della Fantascienza (1967)
3 To the Highest Power (1968)
A Wilderness of Stars (1969)
A Sea of Space (1970)
The Edge of Forever (1971) – Collection of Chad Oliver stories
The Future is Now (1971)
The Human Equation: Four Science Fiction Novels of Tomorrow (1971)
Science Fiction Origins (1980) - Anthology (with Martin H. Greenberg)
Urban Horrors (1990) – Anthology (with Martin H. Greenberg)
California Sorcery, Edited by Nolan and William Schafer (1998)
Offbeat (2002) – Collection of Richard Matheson stories
The Bleeding Edge (2009) – Anthology (with Jason V Brock)
The Devil's Coattails (2012) – Anthology (with Jason V Brock)

Verse
The Mounties (1979) – Broadside
Dark Encounters (1986) – Collection
Have You Seen the Wind? (2003) – Collection, with prose
Ill Met by Moonlight (2004) – Collection, with prose and artwork
Soul Trips (2015) – Collection

Auto racing-specific works
Omnibus of Speed (1958) – Anthology (with Charles Beaumont)
Men of Thunder (1964) – Collection
When Engines Roar (1964) – Anthology (with Charles Beaumont)
Carnival of Speed (1973) – Collection

Horror works
Things Beyond Midnight (1984) – Collection
Blood Sky (1991) – Chapbook
Helltracks (1991) – Novel
Night Shapes (1995) – Collection
William F. Nolan's Dark Universe (2001) – Career retrospective
Nightworlds (2004) – Collection

Miscellaneous works
A Cross Section of Art in Science-Fantasy (1952) – Chapbook
Image Power (1988) – Pamphlet
Rio Renegades (1989) – Western novel
Simply An Ending (2002) – Pamphlet
With Marlowe in L.A. (2003) – Pamphlet

Other Nolan collections
Impact-20 (1963) – Short stories
Alien Horizons (1974)
Wonderworlds (1977)
Down the Long Night (2000)
Ships in the Night: And Other Stories (2003) – Collection of sci-fi, Western, etc.
Wild Galaxy: Selected Science Fiction Stories (2005)
Like a Dead Man Walking and Other Shadow Tales (edited by Jason V Brock; a mix of science fiction, horror, poetry, and literary stories; Centipede Press, 2014)

Screenplays
Burnt Offerings (1976)
Who Goes There? (a.k.a. The Thing) Screen treatment (1978), written for Universal Studios (not produced), published by Rocket Ride Books in "Who Goes There?: The Novella That Formed The Basis of THE THING" (2009)

Television scripts
Brain Wave (1959) – One Step Beyond
Mental Lapse (1959) – Wanted: Dead or Alive
Black Belt (1960) – Wanted: Dead or Alive
The Joy of Living (1971) – Norman Corwin Presents
The Norliss Tapes (1973) – NBC Movie of the Week
The Turn of the Screw (1974) – ABC miniseries
Trilogy of Terror (Millicent and Therese; Julie) (1975) – ABC Movie of the Week
Melvin Purvis: G-Man (1975)
Sky Heist (1975) – NBC Movie of the Week
The Kansas City Massacre (1975) – ABC Movie of the Week
Logan's Run (1977) – Pilot for CBS series
First Loss (1981) – 240-Robert
The Partnership (1981) – Darkroom
Bridge Across Time, a.k.a. Terror at London Bridge (1985) – NBC Movie of the Week
Trilogy of Terror II (The Graveyard Rats; He Who Kills) (1996) – USA Movie of the Week

References

External links
 
 
 
 
 
 Interview with Nolan about the new Logan's Run: Last Day comics from Bluewater Productions
 

1928 births
2021 deaths
20th-century American novelists
American male novelists
American horror writers
American science fiction writers
American mystery writers
Kansas City Art Institute alumni
Writers from Kansas City, Missouri
American male short story writers
Chapbook writers
World Fantasy Award-winning writers
Writers from Vancouver, Washington
20th-century American short story writers
20th-century American male writers
Novelists from Missouri
Novelists from Washington (state)